Conus clerii, common name Clery's cone, is a species of sea snail, a marine gastropod mollusk in the family Conidae, the cone snails and their allies.

Like all species within the genus Conus, these snails are predatory and venomous. They are capable of "stinging" humans, therefore live ones should be handled carefully or not at all.

Distribution
Locus typicus: Cape St. Thomas, State of Rio de Janeiro, Brazil.

This species is found in the Atlantic Ocean, most commonly between Brazil to Northern Argentina.

Description 
The maximum recorded shell length is 65 mm.

Habitat 
Minimum recorded depth is 15 m. Maximum recorded depth is 100 m.

References

 Tucker J.K. & Tenorio M.J. (2009) Systematic classification of Recent and fossil conoidean gastropods. Hackenheim: Conchbooks. 296 pp.
 Puillandre N., Duda T.F., Meyer C., Olivera B.M. & Bouchet P. (2015). One, four or 100 genera? A new classification of the cone snails. Journal of Molluscan Studies. 81: 1–23

External links
 The Conus Biodiversity website
 Cone Shells – Knights of the Sea
 

clerii
Gastropods described in 1844